Jangmisan  is a mountain in the county of Pyeongchang, Gangwon-do in South Korea.

See also
 List of mountains in Korea

Notes

References
 

Mountains of South Korea
Mountains of Gangwon Province, South Korea